Nuke is most commonly used as a slang term for a nuclear weapon, or the act of detonating/setting one off.

Nuke may also refer to:

Computing
 Nuke (software), a node-based compositor
 Nuke (video games), a type of damaging attack that is most commonly used in role-playing, or fighting games.
 Nuke (warez), a label to flag problems with a warez release
 Nuke (computer), a kind of denial-of-service attack

Fiction
 Nuke (Marvel Comics), a villain with the American flag tattooed on his face
 Nuke (Squadron Supreme), a superhero
 "Nuke" LaLoosh, a character in the film Bull Durham
 Nuke, a narcotic in the film RoboCop 2
 Luke Snyder and Noah Mayer, a super couple from the television series As the World Turns

Other uses
 Nuke, slang meaning to cook something using a microwave oven.

See also
 Nuc, a small colony of honeybees
 Nuuk, the capital of Greenland
 Nukem (disambiguation)
 Newk (disambiguation)